Matthew Michels (born March 9, 1960) is an American politician who served as the 38th lieutenant governor of South Dakota, from 2011 to 2019.

Early life and education

Michels was born in Pierre, South Dakota. He graduated with a B.S. from the University of South Dakota in 1981 and his J.D. from the University of South Dakota School of Law in 1985. Michels also worked as a nurse between 1981 and 1985.

Career
He attended Naval Justice School and entered U.S. Navy JAG Corps. He was honorably discharged from the JAG Corps in 1989. He later became general counsel for Avera Health.

A member of the Republican Party, he previously served as speaker of the South Dakota House of Representatives from 2003 to 2007. Dennis Daugaard picked him as his running mate in the 2010 gubernatorial election; they were reelected in 2014.

Electoral history

References

External links
 Lieutenant Governor Matt Michels Homepage

|-

1960 births
2012 United States presidential electors
2016 United States presidential electors
21st-century American politicians
Lieutenant Governors of South Dakota
Living people
People from Pierre, South Dakota
People from Yankton County, South Dakota
South Dakota lawyers
Speakers of the South Dakota House of Representatives
Republican Party members of the South Dakota House of Representatives
University of South Dakota School of Law alumni